Age of maturity may refer to:

Human age
Coming of age, a very young person's transition from childhood to adulthood
Age of majority, the threshold of adulthood as it is conceptualized (and recognized or declared) in law
Puberty, the process of physical changes by which a child's body matures into an adult body capable of sexual reproduction

Other topics
Maturity (finance), the final payment date of a loan or other financial instrument
Sexual maturity, the age or stage when an organism can reproduce